Martinska Ves is village and a municipality in Croatia in the Sisak-Moslavina County. It has a population of 3,488 (2011 census), 98% which are Croats.

The settlements in the municipality are:

 Bok Palanječki, population 138
 Desni Dubrovčak, pop. 115
 Desno Trebarjevo, pop. 334
 Desno Željezno, pop. 170
 Jezero Posavsko, pop. 70
 Lijeva Luka, pop. 233
 Lijevo Trebarjevo, pop. 59
 Lijevo Željezno, pop. 9	
 Ljubljanica, pop. 31
 Mahovo, pop. 269
 Martinska Ves, pop. 683
 Setuš, pop. 157
 Strelečko, pop. 537
 Tišina Erdedska, pop. 305
 Tišina Kaptolska, pop. 259
 Zirčica, pop. 119

History
In the late 19th and early 20th century, Martinska Ves was part of the Zagreb County of the Kingdom of Croatia-Slavonia.

Notable people
 Mihalj Šilobod Bolšić (1724–1787), Roman Catholic priest, mathematician, writer, and musical theorist primarily known for writing the first Croatian arithmetic textbook Arithmatika Horvatzka (published in Zagreb, 1758)

References

Municipalities of Croatia
Populated places in Sisak-Moslavina County